Ng Joe Ee is a Malaysian rhythmic gymnast. She won two gold medals in her debut at the 2022 Commonwealth Games.

References 

Living people
Malaysian rhythmic gymnasts
Gymnasts at the 2022 Commonwealth Games
Commonwealth Games gold medallists for Malaysia
Commonwealth Games medallists in gymnastics
Malaysian people of Chinese descent
Southeast Asian Games gold medalists for Malaysia
Competitors at the 2021 Southeast Asian Games
21st-century Malaysian women
2005 births
Medallists at the 2022 Commonwealth Games